Kentucky Route 2154 (KY 2154) is a  partial beltway around the city of Lebanon. With the exclusion of a short overlap (concurrency) with KY 55, it is entirely an at-grade two-lane highway throughout. For the majority of its length, it is known as Marion County Veterans Memorial Highway.

Route description
The highway begins at a junction with U.S. Route 68 (US 68). It then follows  KY 55 for  The highway then breaks away from KY 55. Next the highway junctions with KY 429, and the highway then turns into a south direction forming a four-way junction with KY 49 just east from the ending of KY 84. The highway then intersects  US 68. The highway then ends at a junction with KY 208.

Major intersections

References 

2154
Transportation in Marion County, Kentucky